Christina Anne McDonald Fritz (born 1969), née Christina Anne McDonald, is a former college and international gymnast from Canada.

McDonald made her international debut at the International Japan Juniors in 1983, placing seventh all-around. She had continued success in the mid-1980s, and was a member of Canada's Olympic team at the 1988 Summer Olympics in Seoul, Korea.

McDonald accepted an athletic scholarship to attend the University of Florida in Gainesville, Florida, where she was a member of coach Ernestine Weaver's Florida Gators women's gymnastics team in National Collegiate Athletic Association (NCAA) competition from 1989 to 1992.  In the opening meet of the Gators' 1989 season, she tore her Anterior cruciate ligament (ACL) on a beam dismount. She returned to competition with the Gators the following season, but chose not to do the vault. McDonald graduated from the University of Florida with a bachelor's degree in health science education in 1993.

McDonald has worked as a missionary at E.W.T.N., Global Catholic Network starting in 2001 - 2010. McDonald married in 2007 in the United States, and took the name "Fritz" as her married name.

Rankings

1983
International Japan Juniors: 7th AA

1984
Champions All: 4th AA

1985
Elite Canada: 2nd AA
American Cup: 7th AA
Canadian Nationals: 3rd AA, 3rd V
Belgian Gym Masters: 5th AA, 1st UB
World Championships: 9th T, 26th AA

1986
Canadian Nationals: 2nd AA, 2nd BB, 2nd FX

1987
Canadian Nationals: 3rd AA, 5th V, 5th UB, 1st BB, 5th FX
World Championships: 8th T

1988
Canadian Olympic Trials
Olympic Games: 11th T

See also 

 Florida Gators
 List of University of Florida alumni
 List of University of Florida Olympians

References

External links 
 Christina McDonald on Gymn.ca

1969 births
Living people
Sportspeople from Oshawa
Florida Gators women's gymnasts
Olympic gymnasts of Canada
Gymnasts at the 1988 Summer Olympics
Canadian female artistic gymnasts